The Danbury Lady Carling Open was a golf tournament on the LPGA Tour from 1968 to 1969. It was played at the Ridgewood Country Club in Danbury, Connecticut.

Winners
Danbury Lady Carling Open
1969 Carol Mann

Gino Paoli Open
1968 Kathy Whitworth

See also
Lady Carling Eastern Open - another LPGA Tour event, played in Massachusetts from 1962 to 1966
Lady Carling Open - another LPGA Tour event, played in Maryland from 1964 to 1973

References

Former LPGA Tour events
Golf in Connecticut
Sports competitions in Connecticut
History of women in Connecticut
Danbury, Connecticut
Recurring sporting events established in 1968
Recurring sporting events disestablished in 1969
1968 establishments in Connecticut
1969 disestablishments in Connecticut